Eat, Drink, Love is an American reality television series on Bravo which premiered on August 11, 2013. The show did not return for a second season.

Premise
Eat, Drink, Love chronicles the lives of five women in the same social circle, the Los Angeles culinary world. It follows the women through their various business ventures and as they look for possible future husbands.

Cast
 Nina Clemente, a 31-year-old private cooking instructor and caterer. She is the daughter of the painter Francesco Clemente and has a degree in anthropology from Brown University.
 Waylynn Lucas, a 32-year-old pastry chef, who has been engaged twice
 Jessica Miller, a culinary marketing specialist
 Kat Odell, a 29-year-old culinary magazine editor
 Brenda Urban, a culinary publicist

Episodes

Reception
Besha Rodell of LA Weekly says the show is more Real Housewife than Top Chef, adding that it perpetuate a lot of stereotypes. Melissa Camcho of Common Sense Media gave the show 3 stars out of 5.

References

External links 

 
 
 

2010s American reality television series
2013 American television series debuts
2013 American television series endings
English-language television shows
Bravo (American TV network) original programming